Thangamana Thangachi is a 1991 Indian Tamil-language drama film directed by Senthilnathan. The film stars R. Sarathkumar and Aamani (credited as Meenakshi) while Mansoor Ali Khan, Ragapriya, Jai Ganesh, Senthil, and K. R. Ganesh, among others, appear in supporting roles. It was released on 15 January 1991.

Plot

Vijay and Seetha are siblings. After their mother's death, Vijay worked hard to come up in life. He brought up his sister alone. Many years later, Vijay becomes a taxi driver. Seetha falls in love with the postman Kannan, while Vijay is in love with his childhood lover Lakshmi. Lakshmi is the daughter of the corrupt politician Marappan, and her brother rapes the young girls as he wishes. At Seetha's wedding, Lakshmi's brother kidnaps Seetha and then rapes and brutally kills her. Vijay decides to take revenge.

Cast

R. Sarathkumar as Vijay
Meenakshi as Lakshmi
Mansoor Ali Khan as Lakshmi's brother
Ragapriya as Seetha
Jai Ganesh as Marappan
Senthil
Shanmugasundaram
K. R. Ganesh as Kannan
Sonia as Geetha
Kamala Kamesh as Meenakshi
Vennira Aadai Moorthy as Kottapatti Kunjithapatham
Loose Mohan
K. Natraj
Senthilnathan
K. R. Prabhu as Prabhu
Chitraguptan as Kili
Vijayachandrika
V. R. Thilagam
Vimalraja
Sivaraman
Chithra
Mary
Vellai Subbaiah
K. Rajan as Paramasivam
Master Tinku as Vijay (young)
Baby Sujitha as Lakshmi (young)

Soundtrack
The music was composed by Shankar–Ganesh, with lyrics written by Kalidasan.

References

External links 
 

1990s Tamil-language films
1991 films
Films directed by Senthilnathan
Films scored by Shankar–Ganesh